Ignacio Colombo (born October 12, 1995 in Buenos Aires) is an Argentinian football forward.

Honours
 Santa Tecla
 Primera División (1): Clausura 2015

References

External links 
 Ignacio Colombo at playmakerstats.com (English version of ceroacero.es)

Living people
1995 births
Argentine footballers
Argentine expatriate footballers
Association football forwards
Expatriate footballers in El Salvador
Santa Tecla F.C. footballers